Doctor Bob (Bob Smith; 1879–1950) was the co-founder of Alcoholics Anonymous

Doctor Bob may also refer to a number of factual or fictional individuals:

 Bob Jones, Sr., American fundamentalist evangelist and founder of Bob Jones University
 Bob Jones, Jr. (1911–1997), president and chancellor of Bob Jones University, and son of Bob Jones, Sr.
 Bob Jones III (born 1939), president of Bob Jones University, and grandson of Bob Jones, Sr.
 Bob McCarron (born 1950), Australian medic and special effects prosthetic makeup artist
 Robert Sears (physician), American physician noted for his unorthodox and dangerous views on childhood vaccination
 Robert Watts (artist) (1923–1988), American artist
 A character in the "Veterinarian's Hospital" sketch on The Muppet Show played by Rowlf the Dog

See also
 Doctor Robert, a 1966 song by the Beatles
 Bill W. and Dr. Bob, a 2013 play by Stephen Bergman and Janet Surrey